Ramón Trujillo (born in 1931) is a linguist specialising in semantics at the University of La Laguna. In 2002 he was given the title of profesor emérito, one of the highest academic distinctions in Spain.

References

Living people
Linguists from Spain
Semanticists
1931 births
Academic staff of the University of La Laguna
People from San Cristóbal de La Laguna